Mata Nui may refer to:

Mata Nui, a character in the Lego Bionicle series
Mata Nui Online Game, a browser game
Mata Nui Online Game II, the sequel to the game of the same name

See also
Motu Nui, an islet near Easter Island
Matanui, a genus of triplefin blennies
Matanaui,  a divergent Amazonian language